Mark Brownell is a Toronto-based playwright and co-artistic director of the Pea Green Theatre Group with his wife, Sue Miner.

He is the author of a number of plays, including Monsieur D'Eon is a Woman, which was nominated for a Governor General's Award. His libretto for the opera Iron Road won a Dora Mavor Moore Award and he was nominated for a Dora for his 2006 play, Medici Slot Machine.

Other award-winning work includes The Martha Stewart Project, Playballs, High Sticking - Three Period Plays, The Chevalier St. George, The Storyteller's Bag and The Weaving Maiden.

Mark is a graduate of the National Theatre School of Canada, and has been a playwright-in-residence at Toronto's Tarragon Theatre. He lives in Toronto with his wife and two children, Lily and Gavin.

Produced stage plays

 Medici Slot Machine (premiere: Tarragon Theatre Extra Space, Toronto. Nominated for Best New Play, Dora Mavor Moore Awards)
 The Weaving Maiden (Soundstreams/Tafelmusik, Glenn Gould Studio, Toronto)
 Ice Time (Libretto; Tapestry Music Theatre, The Distillery, Toronto)
 The Story Teller's Bag (Mississauga International Children's Festival and Lorraine Kimsa Theatre for Young People, Toronto)
 The Enfolded Hamlet (Alumnae Theatre New Ideas Festival, Toronto)
 A Horrifying Monologue (Northern Light Theatre, Edmonton)
 The Chevalier Saint-George (Tafelmusik Baroque Ensemble, Toronto)
 Iron Road (Libretto; Tapestry Music Theatre at the Elgin, Toronto. Winner, Best New Musical, Dora Mavor Moore Awards.)
 Tough Change Project (Joseph Workman Theatre, Toronto)
 Monsieur D'Eon is a Woman (Buddies in Bad Times, Toronto. Nominate for a Dora Mavor Moore award and Governor General's Literary Award, Best New Play.)
 Bells and Whistles (New Adventures in Sound, Tarragon Theatre Spring Arts Fair, Toronto)
 Table Top (Tarragon Theatre Spring Arts Fair, Toronto)
 Martha Steward Projects (Buddies in Bad Times, Toronto. Nominated for a Dora Mavor Moore Award)
 The Venetian Elopement (Toronto Fringe Festival)
 Playballs (Open Fist Theatre, Los Angeles. Winner of the Maxim Mazumdar and 20th Century Ensemble Play Competitions)
 Double Play (Theatre Passe Muraille, Toronto)
 A New Woman (Theatre Centre, Under the Umbrella Festival, Toronto)
 The Blue Wall (Alleyway Theatre, Buffalo)
 High Sticking (Lunchbox Theatre, Calgary)

External links
http://www.peagreentheatre.com

20th-century Canadian dramatists and playwrights
21st-century Canadian dramatists and playwrights
Living people
Canadian male dramatists and playwrights
20th-century Canadian male writers
21st-century Canadian male writers
Year of birth missing (living people)